Khalilur Rahaman (born 1 September 1960) is an Indian politician and Managing Director of Nur Bidi works Pvt. limited and leader of All India Trinamool Congress.

Career
He contested the Parliamentary Election in India 2019 from Jangipur Loksabha. He was elected to the Lok Sabha, lower house of the Parliament of India from Jangipur, West Bengal in the 2019 Indian general election as a member of the All India Trinamool Congress (TMC).

References

Living people
Trinamool Congress politicians from West Bengal
Indian Muslims
Lok Sabha members from West Bengal
India MPs 2019–present
People from Murshidabad district
1960 births